Georges Hamel (20 January 1948 – 26 February 2014) was a Canadian country music singer and songwriter from Quebec.

Hamel was born in Sainte-Françoise, Centre-du-Québec, Quebec, Canada.  Over the course of his 40-year career, Hamel recorded 44 LPs, won four Félix Awards from ADISQ and sold over two million records.

In 2014, Hamel was the recipient of the Excellence Award at the Francophone SOCAN Awards held in Montreal.

He died in Drummondville, Centre-du-Québec in February 2014, at the age of 66.

References

1948 births
2014 deaths
French-language singers of Canada
Canadian male singer-songwriters
Canadian country singer-songwriters
Songwriters from Quebec
Singers from Quebec
20th-century Canadian male singers
French Quebecers
People from Centre-du-Québec